Babble is the second album by Irish alternative rockers That Petrol Emotion, released in 1987. The album was re-released in 2001 with additional tracks. It was the band's only proper chart success, due to being their first and only top 40 entry at #30.

Track listing

Personnel 
That Petrol Emotion
 Steve Mack -  vocals
 John O'Neill -  guitar
 Raymond O'Gorman -  guitar
 Damian O'Neill -  bass guitar 
 Ciaran McLaughlin -  drums

References 

1987 albums
Albums produced by Roli Mosimann
That Petrol Emotion albums
Polydor Records albums